Francis John Bernard McDonough (24 December 1899 – March 1976) was an English professional football goalkeeper who appeared in the Football League for Stockport County, Blackpool, Brentford and Thames. He was captain of Stockport County and Macclesfield.

Honours 
Stockport County
 Football League Third Division North: 1936–37

Career statistics

References

1899 births
1976 deaths
Sportspeople from Easington, County Durham
Footballers from County Durham
Association football goalkeepers
English footballers
Durham City A.F.C. players
Horden Athletic F.C. players
Wheatley Hill Colliery F.C. players
Shotton Colliery Welfare F.C. players
Annfield Plain F.C. players
Brentford F.C. players
Thames A.F.C. players
Blackpool F.C. players
Stockport County F.C. players
Macclesfield Town F.C. players
English Football League players